Vasudeva IV was reportedly a king ruling one the remnants of the Kushan Kingdom from Kandahar.  He was the possible father of Vasudeva of Kabul.

References 

3rd-century monarchs in Asia
Kushan Empire